Gheorghe Mihali (born 9 December 1965) is a retired Romanian football defender and current manager of Liga III squad Dunărea Călărași.

Career
He debuted in Divizia A with FC Olt Scornicești in 1984. He went to Dinamo București in 1991, and helped Dinamo win the title in his debut season. In 1995, he was bought by French club En Avant Guingamp where he spent almost four seasons. Following the relegation of Guingamp in 1998, Mihali eventually returned to Dinamo București where he lifted the Romanian cup titles in 2000 and 2001 before retiring as a player.

Mihali made his debut for the national team in 1991 against Egypt, and earned 31 caps in total. He was in the squad for the 1994 World Cup and Euro 1996.

He turned into coaching a year after his retirement, he managed to coach a youth group of Dinamo Bucharest and in 2002, he was part of Ilie Dumitrescu's team at the helm of Romania U-21.

In 2005, Mihali became assistant coach to Dorinel Munteanu, at CFR Cluj, and in 2006 he followed his former teammate at FC Argeș, where Munteanu was named head coach.

His first full job came in 2007, when Mihali was installed as head coach to CSM Focșani. After 15 games and only 13 points won, Mihali quit the Liga II squad. He didn't stay without a contract for too long. In October 2008 he was named head coach at Universitatea Cluj, where he took over from Dorinel Munteanu, who left for Steaua București. He was sacked in April 2009, because he was questioned by the fans.

Mihali then returned to assistant job, helping Marin Ion in the Arab countries, where the latter managed Ettifaq FC and Dubai CSC. In 2012, Mihali came back to Romania, where he became assistant coach to CSMS Iași, under the spell of Ionuț Popa and Liviu Ciobotariu.

In November 2012, he returned to Dinamo, after 11 years. He was named assistant coach to Dorinel Munteanu.

Honours

Club
Dinamo București
Liga I: 1991–92, 1999–00
Cupa României: 1999–00, 2000–01

Inter Sibiu
Balkans Cup: 1990–91

Guingamp
UEFA Intertoto Cup: 1996
Coupe de France: Runner-up 1996–97

References

External links

1965 births
Living people
People from Borșa
Romanian footballers
Association football defenders
FC Olt Scornicești players
FC Inter Sibiu players
FC Dinamo București players
En Avant Guingamp players
Liga I players
Ligue 1 players
Romanian expatriate footballers
Expatriate footballers in France
Romania international footballers
UEFA Euro 1996 players
1994 FIFA World Cup players
Romanian football managers
FC Universitatea Cluj managers
CS Mioveni managers
CS Balotești managers
FC Dunărea Călărași managers